The Ministry of Environment was the national executive ministry of the Government of Colombia charged with determining and regulating the standards and guidelines for the protection of the environment, investigate and implement environmental policies. As part of a wider cabinet reshuffle in 2002, the ministry was given the housing and land management portfolios, becoming the Ministry of Environment, Housing and Territorial Development.

As of 2010, President Juan Manuel Santos talked about the need to separate the Ministry again to once again bring environmental protection and sustainability in par with the needs of the nation and its importance to government.

Ministers

See also
 Sandra Bessudo Lion

References

Ministries established in 1993
Ministry of Environment and Sustainable Development (Colombia)
Government agencies disestablished in 2002
Defunct government agencies of Colombia
Ministry of Environment, Housing and Territorial Development